El Hiba (alt. el-Hibeh; Arabic الحيبة ) is the modern name of the ancient Egyptian city of Tayu-djayet (t3yw-ḏ3yt), an ancient nickname meaning "their walls" in reference to the massive enclosure walls built on the site. In antiquity, the city was located in the 18th Upper Egyptian nome, and today it is found in the Bani Suwayf governorate.

History
From the late 20th Dynasty to the 22nd Dynasty, Tayu-djayet was a frontier town, marking the division of the country between the High Priests of Amun at Thebes and the kings of Egypt at Tanis. A massive enclosure wall was built at the site, with bricks stamped with the names of the High Priests Pinedjem I and Menkheperre. Earlier, the High Priest Herihor also lived and operated from al-Hibah. During the 22nd Dynasty, king Shoshenq I built a temple dedicated to "Amun-Great-of-Roarings" at the site, complete with a topographical list of cities captured during his "First Campaign of Victory" in Palestine; the temple is also decorated by his son, Osorkon I. The ancient settlement is at  a little to the North of the modern town.

Today
Since 2001, El Hibeh has been the focus of ongoing excavations by a team of U.C. Berkeley archaeologists. However, due to instability as a result of the 2011 Egyptian Revolution, looters have been allowed to systematically plunder the site, digging hundreds of pits, exposing tombs, destroying walls, and leaving human remains strewn about the grounds.

See also
 List of ancient Egyptian towns and cities

Notes

References
Daressy, Georges. 1901. "Le temple de Hibeh." Annales du Service des Antiquités de l’Égypte 2:154–156.
Feucht, Erika. 1978. "Zwei Reliefs Scheshonqs I. aus el Hibeh." Studien zur altägyptischen Kultur 6:69–77.
Ranke, Hermann, ed. 1926. Koptische Friedhöfe bei Karâra und der Amontempel Scheschonks I. bei el Hibe: Bericht über den badischen Grabungen in Ägypten in den Wintern 1913 und 1914. Berlin and Leipzig: Walter de Gruyter & Co.
Wainwright, Geoffrey Avery. 1927. "El Hibah and esh Shurafa and Their Connection with Herakleopolis and Cusæ." Annales du Service des Antiquités de l’Égypte 27:76–104.
Wenke, Robert J. 1984. Archaeological Investigations at el-Hibeh 1980: Preliminary Report. American Research Center in Egypt Reports: Preliminary and Final Reports of Archaeological Excavations in Egypt from Prehistoric to Medieval Times 9. Malibu: Undena Publications

External links 
U.C. Berkeley Excavations at El Hibeh
The Hibeh papyri vol. I, edited with translations and notes by Bernard P. Grenfell and Arthur S. Hunt, 1906 at the Internet Archive
El Hibeh (el-Hiba) on Global Heritage Network
"Save El Hibeh Egypt" Facebook group

Cities in ancient Egypt
Archaeological sites in Egypt
Populated places in Beni Suef Governorate
Former populated places in Egypt